Anna Cropper (also Roache; 13 May 1938 – 22 January 2007) was an English stage and television actress.

Early years
Cropper was born in Brierfield, Lancashire, the daughter of Margaret, a stage actress and director, and Jack Cropper, a dentist. The family lived on Todmorden Road in Burnley during her early life.

Career
Cropper studied acting at the Central School of Speech and Drama in London. She made her television debut as Chrysalis in The Insect Play (1960), based on the 1921 play by Czech brothers Josef and Karel Čapek. She appeared in Emergency Ward 10 three times and on Coronation Street three times in 1962.
 
She came to prominence playing a young schizophrenic in the television play In Two Minds (The Wednesday Play, BBC, 1967) by David Mercer. which won the Writers' Guild Award for the Best Television Play of 1967.

Her film roles included appearances in All Neat in Black Stockings (1968), Cromwell (1970) and Nanou (1986). In 1972 she starred in the television production of The Exorcism and in 1975 took over the lead role in the West End stage version when actress Mary Ure died of an overdose following the play's opening night.

She played Mary Hodgson, the nurse of the boys who inspired the creation of Peter Pan in the BBC docudrama The Lost Boys (1978). Other television roles included two episodes of the BBC's Play for Today, as Norah Palmer in the James MacTaggart-directed Robin Redbreast (1970), a Christmas supernatural thriller by John Bowen and Dennis Potter's play Schmoedipus (1974).

She appeared in The Jewel in the Crown (1984) and featured in Anna of the Five Towns (1985) a 4-part BBC period drama. Her last television credit is for an episode of Midsomer Murders entitled "Death's Shadow" (1999).

Marriage
Cropper married Coronation Street actor William Roache in 1961. They had two children, son Linus Roache and daughter Vanya, and divorced in 1974.

Death
Cropper died suddenly of a heart attack in January 2007, aged 68, at her home in Tangmere, West Sussex. Her daughter, Vanya, died on 2 March 2018 aged 50.

Selected television

Filmography

References

External links

1938 births
2007 deaths
20th-century English actresses
Actresses from Lancashire
Alumni of the Royal Central School of Speech and Drama
English stage actresses
English television actresses
People from Brierfield, Lancashire
People from Burnley
People from Chichester District
20th-century British businesspeople